
Aan de Poel is a fine-dining restaurant in Amstelveen, Netherlands that was awarded one Michelin star for the period 2009–2012. Since 2013, it carries two Michelin stars.

In 2013, GaultMillau awarded the restaurant 16 out of 20 points.

Head chef of Aan de Poel is Stefan van Sprang. Before starting their own restaurant, Sprang and his sommelier Robbert Jan Veuger have worked together at restaurant Ron Blaauw.

The restaurant joined the Alliance Gastronomique Néerlandaise in 2012.

Aan de Poel is located on the shore of lake De Poel.

See also
List of Michelin starred restaurants in the Netherlands

References 

Restaurants in Amstelveen
Michelin Guide starred restaurants in the Netherlands